Boon Teck Single Member Constituency was a constituency in Singapore. It existed from 1972 to 1988 and was merged into Toa Payoh Group Representation Constituency.

Member of Parliament

Elections

Elections in 1970s

Elections in 1980s

References

Singaporean electoral divisions
Toa Payoh